Jalan Ampang Pechah (Selangor state route B54) is a major road in Selangor, Malaysia

List of junctions

Roads in Selangor